The Battle of Congella, beginning 23 May 1842, was between the British of the Cape colony and Voortrekkers or the Boer forces of the Natalia Republic. The Republic of Natalia sought an independent port of entry, free from British control and thus sought to conquer the Port Natal trading settlement which had been settled by mostly British merchants in modern-day KwaZulu-Natal. The battle ended in a British victory due to the heroic ride of Dick King for reinforcements.

Background
According to South African history, in the mid-1820s Shaka, king of the Zulu people swept through the countryside now known as KwaZulu-Natal, killing almost the entire native population of bushmen. Through his conquests, Shaka founded the first unified Zulu Kingdom. A few years later, the English colonists living in the coastal settlement of Port Natal (Durban) requested to be officially recognised by the Cape Government as a dependency of Britain. This was rejected, and as a result the colonists began to trade and settle with the Zulus.

However, the Afrikaner Boers, who had recently left the Cape Colony in the mass exodus called the Great Trek, had ventured over the Drakensberg mountains, settled in the area they named the Natalia Republic and resumed their farming lifestyles. The Zulu people naturally had misgivings about the intentions of the newcomers and war followed soon afterward. Eventually the Cape Government heard news of the Boer republic and the subsequent attacks on white people in Port Natal, and how these attacks were approaching the Cape Colony. The Governor of the Cape, Benjamin d'Urban (the settlement of Port Natal was later named Durban in his honour), sent a regiment to take possession of Natal from the Boers and to settle the Zulu attacks. It was, however, D'Urban's successor, George Thomas Napier, who dispatched Captain Thomas Charlton Smith (who had served at the Battle of Waterloo).

Clash between Dutch (Boer) and British forces
Captain Smith arrived and settled in Port Natal on 4 May 1842, contrary to the vehement demands from the Boers that the British should leave. Smith decided to attack the Boers before they could arrange the support they were expecting. At midnight on the evening of 23 and 24 May, the British forces, including the 1st Battalion, Royal Inniskilling Fusiliers, attacked the well-defended village of "Kongela". The attack failed dismally, and the official history of the Regiment relates the story effectively:

Siege of British camp

The Boers had won a major battle, and Captain Smith had lost many of his men. Smith realised he needed to urgently request reinforcements from the Cape Colony, which was six hundred kilometers of untamed wilderness away. An English trader known as Dick King and colonist volunteered to alert the colony by riding on horseback to Grahamstown. Slipping through the Boers under the cover of night, King and his native assistant escaped and began their seemingly impossible mission. The history of the Regiment continues:

The history continues, saying that the Boers extended a flag of truce proposing that the women and children should be removed from the rustic fort to safety aboard the schooner Mazeppa which was then in port. This chivalrous offer was accepted and 28 people were sent to safety aboard the vessel. Captain Lonsdale described the Boers attacks in a letter to his mother in England:

Lifting of siege

Dick King made the famous horseback journey of 960 kilometers in fourteen days, ten days quicker than the normal journey's length and reinforcements were immediately sent. Thirty one days after Captain Smith recruited King, the reinforcements arrived at Port Natal by ship, aboard the Conch and the South Hampton. The reinforcements relieved Captain Smith and the surrounding Boers soon dispersed. The Mazeppa was brought back (it sailed to Delagoa Bay to escape the fighting) and the women and children safely returned.

References

Notes

Sources

 (A detailed study of the battle)

External links

Captain Thomas Charlton Smith's sword

Congella
History of KwaZulu-Natal
1842 in the Natalia Republic
Conflicts in 1842